Abdullah Al Mansour is a Kuwaiti Ambassador that is serving as the Undersecretary for financial, managerial, and construction affairs in Kuwait's Ministry of Foreign Affairs. Ambassador Abdullah Al Mansour had served previously as the Undersecretary of Finance for financial affairs. He was elected and became the first Kuwaiti Arab League assistant secretary general for auditing in 2005. He then became Kuwait's Arab League representative. After that he became the Undersecretary for financial, managerial, and construction affairs in Kuwait's Ministry of Foreign Affairs. He also served as the vice president of the Organization of Islamic Cooperation. Ambassador Abdullah held other memberships that include a board member in the tourist enterprise company and Jordon Phosphate Mine company.

References

Year of birth missing (living people)
Living people
Ambassadors of Kuwait to the Arab League